Taebaeksan, also known as Mount Taebaeksan or Mount Taebaek, is a South Korean mountain with several important peaks of the Taebaek mountain range (in Western-style geography), or the Taebaek Jeongmaek Range (in Korean-style geography). It is an important mountain in the Baekdu-daegan Mountain-system Baekdudaegan, the point where it turns west after running along Korea's east coast for a long distance. Its territory stretches from the city of Taebaek in Yeongwol-gun County, Gangwon-do Province to Bonghwa-gun County, Gyeongsangbuk-do Province, and it was designated South Korea's 22nd national park on 22 August 2016.

Attractions
Manggyeongsa Temple in Hyeol-dong Taebaek, Yeongwol-gun County, Gangwon-do Province at an elevation of 1,460 meters on Taebaeksan, is a temple built to enshrine the statue of the Bodhisattva of wisdom. It was built by Jajang, a Silla Dynasty monk. The "Dragon Spring" at the entrance of the temple is known as the highest spring in South Korea.

The summit ridge of Taebaeksan is home to a multitude of both azalea bushes and ancient yew trees, making spring (for blossoms) and winter (for rime frost on the twisted trees) particularly good times to visit. The highest peaks are also home to Cheonjedan, a series of ancient Shamanist altars.

The main Danggol entrance plays host to an annual snow festival and a coal mining museum.

See also
 List of mountains in Korea

References

External links
 Taebaeksan National Park
 Taebaeksan Provincial Park (태백산도립공원) by Visit Korea
 Snow Festival by Taebaek City Hall
 Taebaeksan Mountain Snow Festival (태백산 눈축제) by Visit Korea, 2015
 Taebaek-san, the ultra-holy Grand White Mountain
 The Baekdu-daegan Mountain-system

Mountains of South Korea
Mountains of Gangwon Province, South Korea
Mountains of North Gyeongsang Province
Taebaek Mountains